Stony Mountain is a summit in Iron County in the U.S. state of Missouri. Stony Mountain lies about 3.5 miles east of Annapolis and about four miles northeast of Vulcan on Missouri Route 49.

Stony Mountain was so named on account of its granite outcroppings.

References

Mountains of Iron County, Missouri
Mountains of Missouri